MFQ may refer to:

 Maradi Airport, Niger (by IATA code)
 Moba language, spoken in Togo (by ISO 639 code)
 Modern Folk Quartet (later Modern Folk Quintet), an American music group